Jean-Baptiste Morel (10 October 1854 – 7 February 1927) was a French politician who was twice Minister of the Colonies in the period immediately before World War I (1914–18). During the war he led an influential committee on economic warfare.

Early years

Jean-Baptiste Morel was born on 10 October 1854 in Nandax, Loire.
He attended the Ecole supérieure de pharmacie de Paris (Pharmacy School of Paris) where he won various prizes and medals.
He was elected local councilor on 28 July 1889, then Mayor of Charlieu in May 1896.
He became a councilor-general of the Loire department on 9 December 1894, and later became president of the council.

National politics

On 8 May 1898 Morel ran for election as deputy for the Roanne constituency, and won in the first round.
He was reelected in the second round of the April–May 1902 elections.
He ran for election to the Senate on 7 January 1906, but was not elected.
He was reelected deputy on 10 May 1906.
In 1906 Morel was secretary of a Customs Commission to examine tariff needs in a changing industrial landscape.
The committee issued a protectionist report, but the recommendations were blocked by supporters of firms that exported luxury goods.

Morel was appointed Minister of the Colonies on 3 November 1910 in the cabinet of Aristide Briand, holding office until the cabinet fell on 2 March 1911.
He again ran for election to the Senate of 7 January 1912, and this time succeeded.
He was again appointed Minister for the Colonies on 21 January 1913 in the cabinet of Aristide Briand, and retained that position in the succeeding cabinet of Louis Barthou, holding office until 9 December 1913.

During World War I (1914–18) the Bureau d'études économiques (Office of Economic Studies) was set up in July 1915 under Morel's leadership.
The bureau contained permanent officials and parliamentarians, and was a "laboratory of ideas" for conducting economic warfare against Germany both before and after the military conflict.
It also coordinated between the government and the parliamentary committees.
It was highly influential in 1915–16, less so after the Ministry of Commerce took charge of planning for the post-war economy.
Morel's committee was to define France's financial demands at the Versailles Conference.
In 1917 a Comité d'Études was established to prepare for material on national borders for the post-war Peace Conference, and in December 1918 André Tardieu began to coordinate its work with Morel's economic committee, but he had achieved little when the peace conference began.

Morel was reelected to the Senate on 11 January 1920 and on 6 January 1924.
He sat with the Radical Democrats and Radical Socialists.
He died from a paralytic stroke on 7 February 1927 in Paris, at the age of 72.

Legacy
There is a rue Jean Morel in the towns of Regny, Charlieu, Annay and Coudekerque-Branche.

Publications

Notes

Sources

 

1854 births
1927 deaths
People from Loire (department)
Politicians from Auvergne-Rhône-Alpes
Radical Party (France) politicians
French Ministers of the Colonies
Members of the 7th Chamber of Deputies of the French Third Republic
Members of the 8th Chamber of Deputies of the French Third Republic
Members of the 9th Chamber of Deputies of the French Third Republic
Members of the 10th Chamber of Deputies of the French Third Republic
French Senators of the Third Republic
Senators of Loire (department)